Zhang Linghe (born 30 December 1997), also known as 张家玮, is a Chinese actor. He was born in Wuxi City, Jiangsu Province.

Early experiences
In 1997, Zhang Linghe was born in Wuxi, Jiangsu. In 2016, Zhang Linghe was admitted to Nanjing Normal University and majored in electrical engineering at the School of Electrical and Automation Engineering. In addition, Zhang Linghe joined the Aerospace Society because of his interest in physics. By chance, Zhang Linghe met an agent, and after getting to know him better, he found that he was really interested in acting, so he entered the show business circle.

Acting experience

In 2019, starred in the costume romance drama "Girls" and officially entered showbiz. 
In August 2020, starred in the youth school drama "My Time Boy and Me"; in September, starred in the youth romance drama "The Moment of Heartbeat" launched on Mango TV, in which he played the role of the swimming god Mai Sichong.
In May 2021, the starring urban romance drama "The Perfect Him" and the youth school drama "My Time Boy and Me" will be aired successively.
In 2022, starred in the costume romance drama "Ning'an is like a dream"; in August, he made his debut with the role of Changheng, the god of war in the costume fairy tale drama "Canglan Jue".

Film and television works

TV Series/Web Series

Social activity

In September 2020, Zhang Linghe participated in the "Hundred Celebrities Like and Call Hainan Free Trade Port" activity initiated by New Hainan Client, Nanhai.com, Nanguo Metropolis Daily, etc., and paid attention to Hainan Free Trade Port together.

References

Chinese male television actors
21st-century Chinese male actors
1998 births
Living people